Yanakie is a small, coastal township and district on the Yanakie Isthmus in South Gippsland, in the state of Victoria, south-eastern Australia.

Yanakie is a Koori name from the Gunai language interpreted as meaning "between waters".

Description
As the nearest town to the major tourist destination of Wilsons Promontory National Park, Yanakie has several accommodation options including caravan parks with boat ramps, self-contained cabins, like Coastal View Cabins, B&Bs, houses for rent and two camping/caravan sites.  There is a licensed general store with a fuel outlet, a CFA station, a pizza/cafe and a community hall, with a “Settlers Hut” complete with open fire and dirt floor. Additionally there are public toilets, children's playground, tourist information boards and some short bush and coastal walks.
Yanakie hosts regional Camp Drafts (features horse and cattle skills) at a purpose built arena.
Yanakie lies between Corner Inlet on the eastern side of the isthmus and Shallow Inlet on the western side. It is on the Meeniyan-Promontory Road.

The main activity in the surrounding area is dairy farming, mainly because of its good and reliable rainfall.  The second main occupations relate to tourism, with beef and sheep farming numbers increasing. The area also has views towards the northern end of the Promontory, and towards the Toora Hills and Toora Wind Farm across Corner Inlet.

History
The area was one of the last to be settled in rural Victoria.  Just south of the township, one can see the Yanakie drain, which was built to drain water from a large swamp prior to settlement and runs from near the national park boundary to empty into Shallow Inlet. The Post Office opened on 5 December 1892 and closed in 1952.

References

External links
http://www.travelvictoria.com.au/yanakie/

Coastal towns in Victoria (Australia)
Towns in Victoria (Australia)
Shire of South Gippsland